Howard McNeal Burnett (born 8 March 1961) is a retired male sprinter from Jamaica, who mainly competed in the men's 400 metres during his career. He is a one-time Olympian, making his only appearance in 1988 (Seoul, South Korea), when he won the silver medal with the men's 4 × 400 m relay team. He is an alumnus of NYIT.

Achievements

References

1961 births
Living people
Jamaican male sprinters
Olympic athletes of Jamaica
Athletes (track and field) at the 1988 Summer Olympics
Athletes (track and field) at the 1990 Commonwealth Games
Athletes (track and field) at the 1991 Pan American Games
Commonwealth Games medallists in athletics
Olympic silver medalists for Jamaica
Commonwealth Games bronze medallists for Jamaica
Olympic silver medalists in athletics (track and field)
Pan American Games medalists in athletics (track and field)
Pan American Games bronze medalists for Jamaica
Competitors at the 1990 Central American and Caribbean Games
Central American and Caribbean Games gold medalists for Jamaica
Central American and Caribbean Games bronze medalists for Jamaica
Goodwill Games medalists in athletics
New York Institute of Technology alumni
Universiade medalists in athletics (track and field)
Universiade gold medalists for Jamaica
Medalists at the 1988 Summer Olympics
Central American and Caribbean Games medalists in athletics
Medalists at the 1989 Summer Universiade
Competitors at the 1990 Goodwill Games
Medalists at the 1991 Pan American Games
Medallists at the 1990 Commonwealth Games